Vaishali Takkar (15 July 1992 – 15 October 2022) was an Indian television actress. She was known for her portrayal as Anjali Bharadwaj in Sasural Simar Ka, Shivani Sharma in Super Sisters, Netra Singh Rathore in Vish Ya Amrit: Sitara and Ananya Mishra in Manmohini 2.

Early life 
Vaishali Takkar was born on 15 July 1992 in Ujjain, Madhya Pradesh to H.B Takkar and Annu Takkar. She had one brother named Neeraj Takkar (b. 1996).

Career 
Takkar's debut television series was Star Plus's longest running drama Yeh Rishta Kya Kehlata Hai in which she played Sanjana from 2015 to 2016.

In 2016, she acted as Vrinda in Yeh Hai Aashiqui.

From August 2016 to December 2017, she portrayed Anjali Bharadwaj in Colors TV's Sasural Simar Ka opposite Sidharth Shivpuri and Rohan Mehra.

In 2018, she was cast as Shivani in SAB TV's Super Sisters.

Next, she enacted the role of Netra in Colors TV's Vish Ya Amrit: Sitara opposite Arhaan Behll.

From November 2019 to June 2020, Takkar portrayed Ananya/Mansi in Zee TV's Manmohini 2 alongside Karam Rajpal and Reyhna Malhotra.

Personal life 
Takkar got engaged to her boyfriend Dr. Abhinandan Singh from Kenya on 26 April 2021. Their wedding was scheduled for June 2021, but they cancelled a month after their engagement.

Death 
On 15 October 2022, Takkar committed suicide by hanging herself in her home in Tejaji Nagar, Indore, Madhya Pradesh. Her body was discovered by her father on 16 October 2022. A suicide note was found in her bedroom, stating that she had been harassed by her former boyfriend.

Takkar was cremated, her family donated her eyes before cremation.

Filmography

Television

References

External links

 
 

1992 births
2022 deaths
2022 suicides
21st-century Indian actresses
Actresses from Mumbai
Actresses in Hindi television
Indian soap opera actresses
Suicides by hanging in India